Association for Parivartan of Nation is a Ranchi-based Indian non-profit organization. As of 2021, the president of the organization is Hasan Al-Banna.

Right to Education activism 
The organization conducted a study about the 2019-20 academic year in seven districts of Jharkhand and found out around 60 percent of the seats reserved, as per the Right to Information Act, for children from underprivileged background in private schools were not filled. 3578 applications were received for 3383 seats available but only about 40 percent of the seats were filled up. 

In 2021, they starting organizing camps to raise awareness about the provisions as per the Right to Information Act and also to provide information about the required documents along with the application procedure.

References

External links 

 Official website

Non-profit organisations based in India